Leek Brook railway station is a passenger station in Staffordshire, Great Britain.

History

Leek Brook railway station was opened by the North Staffordshire Railway (NSR) in 1904. Leek bound) direction of the Churnet Valley Line.

The railway station was a very quiet station not even advertised in timetables and was described by the NSR as a halt.  The Churnet Valley platform was mainly used as an interchange platform with the St Edwards Hospital tramway using the other side of the platform. Passengers to and from Stoke-on-Trent used the platforms on the Stoke–Leek line and walked over to the Churnet Valley platform to catch a tram to the hospital. Passengers wishing to head south on the Churnet Valley line towards Uttoxeter would have to catch a northbound train to Leek and then return through Leek Brook on a south bound train.

Leek Brook railway station closed to all traffic on 7 May 1956, the hospital railway had already closed two years previously in November 1954.

Churnet Valley Railway 

During the 1970s a railway preservation base was set up at nearby Cheddleton railway station. This was later to become the base of the Churnet Valley Railway (CVR). The CVR had slowly been progressing in preserving the line when in the late 1990s they had reached the site of Leek Brook station which, however, was not judged worthy of re-opening due to the large amount of other preservation projects being undertaken by the CVR at the time and the poor access to the site.

The first CVR passenger service to the station site was on 24 August 1996 and Leek Brook is currently the normal northern terminus of the CVR. Since November 2010, on special events some CVR trains continue beyond the site towards Cauldon Low.

There is no public access to the station, so neither boarding not alighting is possible there. Trains stop there only to detach the locomotive from one end of the train and run round to attach it to the other.

Route

References
Notes

Sources

External links
Churnet Valley Railway homepage

Disused railway stations in Staffordshire
Railway stations in Great Britain closed in 1956
Railway stations in Great Britain opened in 1904
Buildings and structures in Leek
Former North Staffordshire Railway stations